Spirit gum is an adhesive, made mostly of SD Alcohol 35-A (the solvent, or "spirit") and resin (the adhesive, or "gum") originally consisting of mastix, used primarily for affixing costume prosthetics such as wigs, merkins, or false facial hair.  It has been manufactured since at least the 1870s, and has long been a standard tool in theatrical performances where prosthetic makeup or affixed costuming is used. It was mentioned in the earliest known published theatre makeup manual: "How to make-up; a practical guide for amateurs by Haresfoot and Rouge" in 1877. At the end of the nineteenth century, spirit gum could be procured by performers at theatrical wig makers and it was removed with alcohol, cocoa butter or petroleum jelly.

References

Costume design
Adhesives